Morning Star is a 2016 science fiction novel by American author Pierce Brown, the third in his Red Rising trilogy. Morning Star picks up as the lowborn Darrow escapes capture and resumes his campaign against the tyrannical Sovereign of the Society. Pragmatic as ever, he begins to amass the resources and allies he needs to defeat the forces of the Sovereign.

Preceded by Red Rising (2014) and Golden Son (2015), Morning Star was published on February 9, 2016, and debuted at #1 on The New York Times Best Seller list. Brown announced a sequel trilogy in February 2016, to begin with the novel Iron Gold in January 2018.

Plot
Darrow is a shadow of his former self after a year of torture and imprisonment at the hands of Adrius au Augustus, the ArchGovernor of Mars, better known as the Jackal. Across the worlds, he is believed dead because of a public execution faked by the Jackal and Octavia au Lune, the Sovereign. Sevro au Barca, now leader of the Sons of Ares, sends his deputy Holiday ti Nakamura to rescue Darrow. Darrow discovers that Victra au Julii is also still alive and frees her as well. Reconciling and recovering at a hidden rebel stronghold, Darrow and Victra join Sevro's gang of Howlers. Their first mission is to kidnap Quicksilver, the richest man in the Society, who they believe is the Jackal's silent partner. Darrow and his men stumble into a peace negotiation between some of the Sovereign's underlings — Cassius au Bellona, Moira au Grimmus and the Death Knight — on one side, and Darrow's old friends — Virginia "Mustang" au Augustus, Kavax au Telemanus and Daxo au Telemanus — on the other. The room erupts in conflict and destruction; Moira and the Death Knight are killed. Mustang is shocked to find Darrow alive, and the Howlers manage to escape with Quicksilver and Kavax as prisoners. Quicksilver reveals that he had secretly co-founded the Sons of Ares with Sevro's late father Fitchner au Barca, and offers his considerable resources to Darrow. Kavax also makes peace with Darrow and offers him allegiance.

The Sons seize control of the moon Phobos as a distraction, allowing Darrow, Ragnar and Holiday to slip away to seek an alliance with Ragnar's mother Alia Snowsparrow, an Obsidian queen. They are intercepted and then joined by Mustang, who renews her dedication to Darrow and his cause. They learn too late that they have been followed by an enemy ship. Both ships exchange fire and crash into the frozen wasteland of Obsidian territory. Plagued by cannibalistic tribes of Obsidian outcasts, Darrow and his companions ambush their Gold pursuers, Aja au Grimmus and Cassius. Darrow and Mustang neutralize Cassius, but Ragnar is mortally wounded by Aja before she escapes. Ragnar's sister Sefi arrives in time to be reunited with him, only to watch him die. Hoping that the fierce Obsidian warriors will join his rebellion when they see that their "gods" are just men who have subjugated them, Darrow and Mustang lead Sefi and her Valkyrie to overtake the Golds who style themselves as Norse gods for the superstitious Obsidians. Alia still refuses to follow Darrow's cause and denounces his group as heretics, so Sefi kills her mother and then the former "gods". Sefi becomes queen and manages to rally all of the Obsidian tribes to join Darrow's crusade, leaving the polar region for the Sons of Ares' stronghold with a wounded Cassius in tow. Cassius reveals that the Sovereign's secret stockpile of nuclear weapons has been stolen, likely by the Jackal.

Darrow and Mustang seek an alliance with the Moon Lords of Jupiter, who are led by the self-declared Sovereign of the Outer Rim, Romulus au Raa. Darrow's former friend Roque au Fabii is also there, in his position as the Imperator of Octavia au Lune's Sword Armada, to negotiate a truce with the Moon Lords. Darrow secures their support against Octavia when he manipulates Roque into confirming that she possesses planet-destroying atomic weapons to use against them if necessary. Darrow's forces are joined by those of the Moon Lords against Roque's Sword Armada and the fleet of Victra's brutal sister, Antonia au Severus-Julii. Using a tactical ruse, Darrow along with Sefi's Obsidians board Roque's flagship. They overtake the ship, and the proud Roque, refusing to surrender, commits suicide. Antonia flees, but is soon captured by Victra. After the battle, Sefi and her Obsidians instigate a riot among the Sons of Ares to execute their Gold prisoners, having been enraged by the savagery of the Jackal. Sevro proves their hypocrisy in dramatic fashion by first hanging Cassius for killing Fitchner, and then hanging himself for his own multiple murders. Astonished, Sefi cuts them both down before they die, and Sevro makes peace with the Obsidians. Sevro and Victra are married in the week thereafter.

Darrow's Red Armada arrives at Luna to attack the Sovereign. Darrow, Sevro and Mustang release Cassius, who swears to distance himself from the war — until he suddenly grabs Sevro's scorcher and shoots him to death. Cassius stuns Darrow and Mustang, sets Antonia free, and the duo take Darrow, Mustang and Sevro's body with them to deliver to the Sovereign. They meet the Jackal, who coerces Cassius to sever Darrow's hand. Octavia orders Aja to execute Antonia for her dishonorable conduct during the battle with the Moon Lords, and sentences Darrow to death in a live telecast. Cassius,  however, kills the Sovereign's Praetorian guards and releases Darrow and Mustang. Darrow fatally stabs Octavia and incapacitates the Jackal. While Cassius and Mustang face Aja, Darrow revives a sedated Sevro. Aja is slain under their combined efforts. The Jackal instructs Darrow to commit suicide, under threat of detonating the nuclear bombs he has placed across Luna. Darrow tears out the Jackal's tongue while Mustang and Lysander direct both the loyalist and the Rising fleets to fire upon the Jackal's flagship that was responsible for detonating the nukes. Nevertheless, twelve nukes go off, killing millions.

With the support of Octavia's young grandson Lysander, Mustang takes control as Sovereign. She disbands the Senate and begins dismantling the Color system and the tyrannical social infrastructure of the Golds. The Jackal is publicly executed. Cassius, having made peace with Darrow and himself, takes off with Lysander to raise the boy in exile. Mustang reveals to Darrow the existence of their son, Pax, who was born while Darrow was presumed dead, and had been secretly in the care of Kavax's wife. Darrow vows to himself to create a better world for his son to live in.

Characters

The Rising 
The Rising is the revolutionary movement featured in the book, which seeks to reform or overthrow the ruling hierarchy to achieve fair treatment and justice for all human races. It comprises The Sons of Ares (the rebellious organization that originally started the movement), The Sun Industries (their financier), several Obsidian tribes and part of the fleet of the Lion House of Mars. Their characters include:
 Darrow au Andromedus of Lykos,  "Reaper" and "Morning Star" (Gold/Red): a Red physically remade into a Gold to infiltrate and destroy the Society, he is the leader of "The Rising", the force rebelling against the Society. Darrow is a charismatic strategist and is not afraid of taking immense risks, but refuses to act like a terrorist and goes to a great lengths to prove he is not another destroyer.
 Virginia au Augustus, a.k.a. "Mustang" (Gold): daughter of Nero, the former ArchGovernor of Mars, and the estranged twin sister of the Jackal. When her former lover Darrow is betrayed, imprisoned and presumed dead, Mustang and her forces secede and join the separatists of the outer rim in what is called the Second Moon Rebellion. There, she and the Moon Lords fight the Sword Armada of the Sovereign. After her peace meeting with delegates of the Sovereign is interrupted, she joins The Rising but stipulates that Darrow must prove that he is not just another tyrant.
 Sevro au Barca, a.k.a. "Goblin" (Gold): Darrow's best friend and second-in-command, he is the foulmouthed acting leader of the Sons of Ares. Unlike Darrow, while Sevro is in command of the Sons of Ares, he resorts to terrorist tactics like bombing. The Jackal takes advantage of this to broadcast anti-rebellion sentiments, even going to great lengths to commit acts of terror of his own for which the Sons of Ares are blamed. Under Sevro's leadership, the Sons lose their financial support and consistently fail to ally themselves with other rebelling factions. Sevro does not relinquish command to Darrow immediately when he arrives; Darrow has to wrest control by first beating Sevro and then reminding him how they became friends.
 Victra au Julii (Gold): Darrow's loyal lieutenant, and half sister of Antonia au Severus-Julii, she is imprisoned and tortured at the same time as Darrow. Unlike Darrow, however, her only motive for joining The Rising is revenge against her sister. As she and Sevro fell in love, however, revenge ceases to be an exclusive motive.
 Ragnar Volarus, a.k.a. "Shield of Tinos" (Obsidian): Darrow's lieutenant, Ragnar has an unusually loud voice that other Obsidians don't. Having grown up among the superstitious and intellectually undeveloped Obsidians and recruited as a slave warrior into the Society, Ragnar has made several attempts to show them the light but his messengers have been executed. He is fatally wounded in a one-on-one battle with Aja au Grimmus but refuses to die in the traditional way of other unenlightened Obsidians (by refusing to hold his weapon). During his last moments, he urges Darrow to kill his mother, Alia Snowsparrow, who has deliberately kept other Obsidians in dark and will not be swayed by words
 Sefi the Quiet (Obsidian): Ragnar's sister, the silence-oathbound daughter of Alia Snowsparrow, and the heir apparent to the throne of a tribe of Obsidians known as Valkyries. Upon discovering that the Gods she and her tribe worship are mortal Golds in disguise, she deposes her mother, becomes the queen of Valkyries and starts speaking again. She is instrumental in causing other Obsidian tribes to become allies of The Rising. Later, after the victory over the Sword Armada, all other Obsidian tribes recognize her as their first pan-tribal queen.
 Holiday ti Nakamura (Gray): a Gray Legionnaire secretly working for the Sons of Ares, and Darrow's deputy. Her brother Trigg is killed rescuing Darrow and Victra from imprisonment.
 Regulus ag Sun, a.k.a. "Quicksilver" (Silver): a Silver and the richest man in the Society through ownership of the helium-3 refineries on Phobos. As the co-founder of the Sons of Ares, Quicksilver stops funding Sevro and his terrorist activities but is nevertheless instrumental in building their secret hideout city, Tinos. Quicksilver believes that the Society has brought the mankind's evolution to a halt and has stifled the scientific progress to maintain dominance. In his view, what the downtrodden race of Reds do should be done by robots. For the second half of the book, he contributes to The Rising through cyberwarfare.
 "Dancer" (Red): Darrow's mentor in the Sons of Ares and later the Sons' liaison for the Reds.
"Narol" (Red): Darrow's uncle. He is caught sabotaging the Jackal's satellites and is tortured and executed. His execution is broadcast to Darrow's fleet, triggering the Obsidian riot led by Sefi.

The Society 
The Society is the tyrannical government that has ruled the whole solar system but lost control of all planets beyond the asteroid belt before the start of the book. It characters include:
 Adrius au Augustus, a.k.a. "Jackal" (Gold): Virginia's twin brother, the sociopathic ArchGovernor of Mars. Jackal is not afraid of genocide, having bombed one city from space during the events of the book. Before the events of the novel, the Jackal has stolen 400 nuclear warheads, each having a yield of 30 megatons. He has ordered these warheads to be planted on Luna, the capital of the Society, and plans to used them as leverage to become the Sovereign. When the Sovereign dies, the Jackal uses the same gambit against Darrow, but loses.
 Alia Snowsparrow (isn't society) (Obsidian): Queen of the Obsidian tribe Valkyries, she is famous for her devotion to her Gods and her religion. Unbeknownst to all, Alia knows that her Gods are a ruse, yet becomes part of the ruse to remain the ruler. When she refuses to abandon the charade, she is killed by her daughter, Sefi.
 Cassius au Bellona, the Morning Knight (Gold): Cassius and Darrow harbor deep hatred towards one another as Darrow has been instrumental in extermination of the Bellona family and Cassius has previously killed several of Darrow's friends. Cassius, however, hosts a damaged sense of honor and loyalty which has turned him into a confused character. He spends the large part of the book in captivity. However, he strikes an alliance with Darrow when he sees footage given to him by Darrow of his family being assassinated by the Jackal's forces.
 Octavia au Lune (Gold): the Sovereign of the Society. She became Sovereign by decapitating her own father (a tyrannical Sovereign) and presenting it to the senate. She ruled for sixty years and is a staunch believer that the color system brings about the prosperity of the mankind. Ironically, her first spoken words in the book convey that she cannot be bothered with civilian casualties.
 Roque au Fabii, a.k.a. "Poet of Deimos" (Gold): Imperator of the Sovereign's Sword Armada. Although Darrow calls him a former friend, in reality, he has been an enemy of Darrow far longer than Darrow realizes. Defeated in the battle of the outer rim, Roque commits suicide.
 Antonia au Severus-Julii (Gold): Praetor of the Fifth and Sixth Legions and Victra's half-sister, she has shot Victra in the spines and is the reason she spent a year under torture in the custody of the Jackal. During the battle of the outer rim, she commits dereliction of duty. As such, the Sovereign has her executed.
 Lysander au Lune (Gold): grandson and heir of the Sovereign.
 Magnus au Grimmus, a.k.a. "Ash Lord" (Gold): father of Aja and Moira, he is the supreme commander of the Sovereign's fleet. Near the end of the book, he battles the fleet of the rising but is convinced to end the combat when nuclear bombs of the Jackal begin detonating on Luna. At the behest of the Mustang, he directs the loyalists to fire on the Jackal's flagship.
 Aja au Grimmus, the Protean Knight (Gold): the Sovereign's bodyguard and the daughter of the Ash Lord, Aja is most dangerous swordsman in the book. Her mentor has likened fighting Aja to fighting a river. Aja puts up a fierce battle before dying and is only overcome by the combined forces of four Golds.
 Lilath au Faran (Gold): Companion of the Jackal and the leader of his Boneriders division, she is placed on the Jackal's flagship to detonate nukes on Luna. She is assumed dead when the Jackal's flag ship is fired upon from all sides by both the loyalists and the Rising.

Others 
 Romulus au Raa (Gold): ArchGovernor of Io, he secedes from the Society in the Second Moon Rebellion. Romulus is a strong disciplinarian who believes children must not be spoiled by servants and luxuries that they did not earn.
 Dio (Red): sister of Darrow's late wife, Eo.

In March 2016, Brown named Victra is his favorite character to write, saying that she "is dark and broken...but she finds her way back". He added, "And the Jackal because he's that little dark part of me that is lonely, the jealous part. He just always wants what he can't have." Brown said of Mustang's final mercy towards her brother, the Jackal, that "Some readers have been very vocal that they didn't think that he deserved any mercy, but I always felt he was as much a victim of his own life, and even if redemption was not possible, someone showed him love at the very end." Brown also noted that he almost killed off Cassius, saying "Cassius' taking care of Lysander also gave me a reason to save him. Darrow would have killed him otherwise. Ultimately, he didn't kill him because he felt guilty. Which plays into the next series ..."

Publication
Morning Star is the third and final novel in Brown's Red Rising trilogy, preceded by Red Rising (2014) and Golden Son (2015). In August 2015, Brown said of the novel:

It was published on February 9, 2016, and debuted at #1 on The New York Times Best Seller list. It reached #1 on USA Today Best-Selling Books list, and won the Goodreads Choice Award for science fiction.

Brown announced a sequel trilogy in February 2016, to begin with the novel Iron Gold in August 2017.

Reception
Kirkus Reviews called Morning Star an "ambitious and satisfying conclusion to a monumental saga", noting that "Brown creates an alternative universe that is multilayered and seething with characters who exist in a shadow world between history and myth, much as in Frank Herbert’s Dune." Marc Snetiker of Entertainment Weekly referred to Brown as "science fiction's best-kept secret", calling the novel "devastating and inspiring" and writing that "the violence here is grimmer, its humor more unsettling, its forgiveness rarer, its casualties more sickening." Publishers Weekly called the Morning Star "excellent", adding that "Brown's vivid, first-person prose puts the reader right at the forefront of impassioned speeches, broken families, and engaging battle scenes that don't shy away from the gore as this intrastellar civil war comes to a most satisfying conclusion." Kristine Huntley of Booklist described the novel as "simply stellar", calling it "a page-turning epic filled with twists and turns, heartbreaks and daring gambles" and praising Brown's "fabulously imagined universe". Comparing the series to Star Wars and calling Morning Star "this trilogy's Return of the Jedi", Niall Alexander wrote in Tor.com that "as an ending, it absolutely satisfies" while noting some flaws in pacing, character development and accessibility for new readers. Jason Sheehan of NPR praised Brown's vivid action scenes but wrote that this third installment is heavy on exposition.

References

External links
 
 

2016 American novels
2016 science fiction novels
American adventure novels
American science fiction novels
Dystopian novels
Classical mythology in popular culture
Fiction set on Jupiter's moons
Novels set on Mars
Novels about slavery
Novels by Pierce Brown
Fiction set on Phobos (moon)
Fiction set on Rhea (moon)
Science fantasy novels
Works about women in war
Del Rey books